Leonardo Michelotti (born 15 March 1965) is an Italian swimmer. He competed at the 1988 Summer Olympics and the 1992 Summer Olympics.

References

1965 births
Living people
Italian male swimmers
Olympic swimmers of Italy
Swimmers at the 1988 Summer Olympics
Swimmers at the 1992 Summer Olympics
Sportspeople from Cremona
Mediterranean Games bronze medalists for Italy
Mediterranean Games medalists in swimming
Swimmers at the 1991 Mediterranean Games
20th-century Italian people
21st-century Italian people